Arvi Taneli (Tatu) Malmivaara (29 April 1908 - 8 February 1987) was a Finnish Lutheran clergyman and politician. He was a member of the Parliament of Finland from 1945 to 1948, representing the National Coalition Party. He was born in Lapua, the son of Väinö Malmivaara.

References

1908 births
1987 deaths
People from Lapua
People from Vaasa Province (Grand Duchy of Finland)
20th-century Finnish Lutheran clergy
National Coalition Party politicians
Members of the Parliament of Finland (1945–48)
Finnish people of World War II
University of Helsinki alumni